The discography of Dave East, an American rapper, consists of one studio album, two collaborative studio album, fifteen mixtapes, one extended play (EP), and nineteen singles (including thirteen as a featured artist).

Albums

Studio albums

Collaboration mixtapes

Mixtapes

EPs

Singles

As lead artist

As featured artist

Guest appearances

References

External links
 

Discographies of American artists
Hip hop discographies